Niccolò Cannone (born 17 May 1998) is an Italian professional rugby union player who primarily plays lock for Benetton of the United Rugby Championship.

Professional career 
Cannone has previously played for clubs such as Petrarca in the past. For 2018–19 Pro14 and 2019–20 Pro14 season, he named as Permit Player for Benetton in Pro 14.

After playing for Italy Under 20 in 2017 and 2018, in 2020 Cannone was named in the Italy squad for the Six Nations 2020, having made his test debut against Wales during the 2020 Six Nations Championship.

References

External links 

1998 births
Living people
Sportspeople from Florence
Italian rugby union players
Italy international rugby union players
Rugby union locks
Petrarca Rugby players
Benetton Rugby players